HMS Roberts was an  monitor of the Royal Navy that served in the First World War.

Background
On 3 November 1914, Charles M. Schwab of Bethlehem Steel offered Winston Churchill, then First Lord of the Admiralty, the use of four /45cal BL MK II twin gun turrets, originally destined for the Greek ship .  These turrets could not be delivered to the German builders, due to the British naval blockade.  The Royal Navy immediately created a class of monitors, designed for shore bombardment, to use the turrets.

Roberts was laid down at the Swan Hunter,  Ltd shipyard at Wallsend on 17 December 1914.  The ship was named Stonewall Jackson in honour of the CSA General Thomas Jonathan "Stonewall" Jackson, however as the United States was still neutral, the ship was hurriedly renamed HMS M4 on 31 May 1915.  She was then named HMS Earl Roberts on 19 June 1915 and again renamed HMS Roberts on 22 June 1915

Service history
Roberts sailed for the Dardanelles in June 1915.  She remained in the Eastern Mediterranean until returning to England in February 1916.  She served as a guard ship at Yarmouth until the end of the War. She decommissioned in May 1919, and was initially sold for breaking up in May 1921, but was retained by the Admiralty for trials.

Around 1925 she was considered for conversion to a mobile airship base with a mooring mast and fueling capabilities, but nothing came of this proposal.  In the 1930s, she was used for testing underwater protection for new construction warships.  She was finally sold in September 1936 to the Ward shipyard at Preston for breaking up.

In command
Captain H.N. Garnett, (May 1915–?)
Commander W.A. Thompson, (?)
Commander Kenneth Dewar, (August 1916 – 1917)
Commander B.M. Eyres-Monsell, (September 1918–?)
Lieutenant-Commander E.J.J. Southby, (January 1919May 1919)

Citations

References
 Dittmar, F. J. & Colledge, J. J., "British Warships 1914-1919", (Ian Allan, London, 1972), 
 Gray, Randal (ed), "Conway's All the World's Fighting Ships 1906–1921", (Conway Maritime Press, London, 1985),

External links 

 Writeup at Roll of Honour

 

Abercrombie-class monitors
Ships built on the River Tyne
1915 ships
World War I monitors of the United Kingdom
Ships built by Swan Hunter